Muzio is an Italian given name and surname.

Notable people with the given name include:

Muzio Clementi (1752-1832), Italian composer
Muzio Sforza (1369-1424), Italian nobleman and condottiero, father of Francesco I Sforza, Duke of Milan

Notable people with the surname include:

Christine Muzio (born 1951), French fencer
Claudia Muzio (1889–1936), Italian operatic soprano
Emanuele Muzio (1821–1890), Italian composer, conductor and vocal teacher
Giovanni Muzio (1893-1982), Italian architect
Girolamo Muzio (1496–1576), Italian courtier, poet, and author in defence of the vernacular Italian language against Latin
Gloria Muzio, American theatre and television director

See also
Picco Muzio